Richard Damon Elliott (April 30, 1886 – December 22, 1961) was an American character actor who played in over 240 films from the 1930s until the time of his death.

Early years
Elliott was born in Boston, Massachusetts.

Career
Elliott played many different roles, typically as a somewhat blustery sort, such as a politician.  A short, fat man, Elliott played Santa Claus on the Jimmy Durante, Red Skelton, and Jack Benny programs. Elliott had a couple of memorable lines in It's a Wonderful Life (1946), in which he scolded James Stewart, who was trying to say goodnight to Donna Reed, advising him: "Why don't you kiss her instead of talking her to death?"

He also had a few memorable appearances in episodes of the Adventures of Superman television series. He appeared three times as Stanley on the CBS sitcom December Bride, as well as on two of ABC/Warner Brothers' western series, Sugarfoot and Maverick. He was cast as the prospector Peter Cooper and then as Sheriff Tiny Morris in two segments of CBS's Tales of the Texas Rangers. He appeared twice as Doc Thornton on ABC's The Real McCoys. Elliott is perhaps best known as Mayberry's Mayor Pike in early episodes of CBS's The Andy Griffith Show, one of his last screen works.  In two of the eleven episodes featuring Elliot as mayor, actress Josie Lloyd portrayed his daughter.

Death
On December 22, 1961, the 75-year-old Elliott died from complications of severe cardiovascular disease.

Selected filmography 

 Central Airport (1933) - Man Looking for Driver (uncredited)
 Picture Snatcher (1933) - Editor (uncredited)
 The Silk Express (1933) - Garson (uncredited)
 The Last Trail (1933) - Train Passenger (uncredited)
 The Worst Woman in Paris? (1933) - Mayor Rodney (uncredited)
 Please (1933, Short) - Johnny's Father
 Woman Unafraid (1934) - Tom Brady
 The Merry Frinks (1934) - 1st Reporter (uncredited)
 We're Rich Again (1934) - Mr. Green, the Yachtsman
 Helldorado (1935) - Mayor (uncredited)
 Times Square Lady (1935) - Stage Doorman (uncredited)
 It Happened in New York (1935) - Publicity Man
 Princess O'Hara (1935) - Agent (uncredited)
 Reckless (1935) - Man Near Drums (uncredited)
 Mister Dynamite (1935) - Buck (uncredited)
 Men of the Hour (1935) - Theatre Manager
 Break of Hearts (1935) - Max (uncredited)
 Ladies Crave Excitement (1935) - Stark's Aide (uncredited)
 Welcome Home (1935) - Emanuel Bond (uncredited)
 The Public Menace (1935) - Apartment House Manager (uncredited)
 Dr. Socrates (1935) - Photographer (uncredited)
 Annie Oakley (1935) - Major Ned Buntline (uncredited)
 One Way Ticket (1935) - Matty (uncredited)
 Your Uncle Dudley (1935) - Theater Manager (uncredited)
 Her Master's Voice (1936) - Police Captain
 The Prisoner of Shark Island (1936) - Actor at Ford's Theatre (uncredited)
 Silly Billies (1936) - Mayor Culpepper (uncredited)
 Brilliant Marriage (1936) - Newspaper Editor
 Special Investigator (1936) - Gabby Citizen (uncredited)
 Neighborhood House (1936) - Perkins - Charley's Boss
 The Princess Comes Across (1936) - the ship's doctor (uncredited)
 Educating Father (1936) - Townley (uncredited)
 High Tension (1936) - Sundholm (uncredited)
 The Big Game (1936) - Lowell (uncredited)
 Go West, Young Man (1936) - Union News Service Reporter (uncredited)
 Wanted! Jane Turner (1936) - Arizona Sheepman (uncredited)
 You Only Live Once (1937) - City Editor (uncredited)
 Outcast (1937) - Ticket Agent (uncredited)
 China Passage (1937) - Philip Burton
 The Outcasts of Poker Flat (1937) - Stumpy Carter
 Behind the Headlines (1937) - 2nd Bartender (uncredited)
 Parnell (1937) - Middle Aged Man (uncredited)
 Roaring Timber (1937) - Auditor (uncredited)
 Walter Wanger's Vogues of 1938 (1937) - Johnny Withers - Ticket Broker (uncredited)
 Counsel for Crime (1937) - Bundy (uncredited)
 Quick Money (1937) - Jeffrey Walker
 Every Day's a Holiday (1937) - Bar Patron (uncredited)
 The Jury's Secret (1938) - Donald Graves (uncredited)
 International Settlement (1938) - Ocean Liner Passenger (uncredited)
 Penitentiary (1938) - McNaulty (uncredited)
 Start Cheering (1938) - Station Agent (uncredited)
 Mr. Moto's Gamble (1938) - Kansas City Gambler (uncredited)
 Under Western Stars (1938) - William P. Scully
 Riders of the Black Hills (1938) - Good Neighbor Spokesman (uncredited)
 Prison Farm (1938) - The Glenby Judge (uncredited)
 Little Miss Broadway (1938) - Man with Bass Fiddle (uncredited)
 The Crowd Roars (1938) - Mr. Burns (uncredited)
 The Man from Music Mountain (1938) - Mr. Harkness (uncredited) 
 Tenth Avenue Kid (1938) - Gun Salesman (uncredited)
 Meet the Girls (1938) - Party Guest (uncredited)
 Campus Confessions (1938) - Member Board of Regents (uncredited)
 Down on the Farm (1938) - Slicker (uncredited)
 A Man to Remember (1938) - Hank (uncredited)
 Next Time I Marry (1938) - Henry (uncredited)
 Disbarred (1939) - Small-Town Juror (uncredited)
 Boy Trouble (1939) - Dr. Benschlager
 The Lone Wolf Spy Hunt (1939) - Patrol-Car Cop at Italian Restaurant (uncredited)
 I'm from Missouri (1939) - Mule Judge
 Let Us Live (1939) - Rotarian Juror (uncredited)
 The Story of Vernon and Irene Castle (1939) - Train Conductor (uncredited)
 Sudden Money (1939) - Gambler (uncredited)
 The Story of Alexander Graham Bell (1939) - Man Laughing at Demo (uncredited)
 Undercover Agent (1939) - Garrison
 Frontier Marshal (1939) - Drunk (uncredited)
 I Stole a Million (1939) - Small-Town Doctor (uncredited)
 Nancy Drew and the Hidden Staircase (1939) - McKeever
 Mr. Smith Goes to Washington (1939) - Carl Cook
 Pack Up Your Troubles (1939) - Booking Agent (uncredited)
 Another Thin Man (1939) - Detective (uncredited)
 The Amazing Mr. Williams (1939) - Druggist (uncredited)
 All Women Have Secrets (1939) - The Justice of the Peace
 Abe Lincoln in Illinois (1940) - Politician (uncredited)
 Women Without Names (1940) - Roomer (uncredited)
 Two Girls on Broadway (1940) - Ice Rink Security Man (uncredited)
 Flight Angels (1940) - Mr. Rutledge
 Florian (1940) - Auctioneer (uncredited)
 The Mortal Storm (1940) - Passport Official on Train (uncredited)
 One Man's Law (1940) - Prendergast
 Scatterbrain (1940) - (uncredited)
 I Love You Again (1940) - Range Leader (uncredited)
 Ride, Tenderfoot, Ride (1940) - Airport Agent (uncredited)
 Up in the Air (1940) - Hastings
 I'm Still Alive (1940) - Dan Foley (uncredited)
 Young Bill Hickok (1940) - Elliott (uncredited)
 Li'l Abner (1940) - Marryin' Sam
 Melody Ranch (1940) - Sheriff Barstow (uncredited)
 A Night at Earl Carroll's (1940) - Old Man (uncredited)
 Behind the News (1940) - Foster
 Four Mothers (1941) - Ed (uncredited)
 Back Street (1941) - Hotel Desk Clerk (uncredited)
 A Man Betrayed (1941) - Ward Heeler (uncredited)
 Footlight Fever (1941) - Eric Queegle (uncredited)
 Mr. District Attorney (1941) - Detective in Café (uncredited)
 The Wagons Roll at Night (1941) - Mr. Paddleford (uncredited)
 She Knew All the Answers (1941) - Broker
 Sunset in Wyoming (1941) - Lieutenant Governor Cornelius Peabody
 Manpower (1941) - Drunk Texan (uncredited)
 The Pittsburgh Kid (1941) - Garvey
 Two Latins from Manhattan (1941) - Sylvester Kittelman (uncredited)
 One Foot in Heaven (1941) - Casper Cullenbaugh (scenes deleted)
 Top Sergeant Mulligan (1941) - Mr. Lewis
 Three Girls About Town (1941) - Magician Boarding Bus (uncredited)
 Tuxedo Junction (1941) - 1st Rose Parade Judge (uncredited)
 The Body Disappears (1941) - (scenes deleted)
 Road to Happiness (1941) - the kindly pawnbroker (uncredited)
 All Through the Night (1942) - Losing Bidder's Husband (uncredited)
 Man from Headquarters (1942) - Editor Elwin A. Jonas
 Yokel Boy (1942) - Doctor (uncredited)
 The Affairs of Jimmy Valentine (1942) - Tim Miller
 My Favorite Blonde (1942) - Dan (uncredited)
 So's Your Aunt Emma (1942) - Evans
 We Were Dancing (1942) - Mr. Samson Platt (uncredited)
 Sweetheart of the Fleet (1942) - Chumley
 Meet the Stewarts (1942) - Mr. Willoughby (uncredited)
 I Married an Angel (1942) - Oscar Scallion (uncredited)
 Wildcat (1942) - Harris (uncredited)
 You Can't Escape Forever (1942) - Meeker (uncredited)
 Criminal Investigator (1942) - Ed Brandt (uncredited)
 Scattergood Survives a Murder (1942) - Mathew Quentin
 Springtime in the Rockies (1942) - Mr. Jeepers (uncredited)
 Wrecking Crew (1942) - Traveling Salesman (uncredited)
 Laugh Your Blues Away (1942) - Mr. Conklin
 The Powers Girl (1943) - Beauty Pageant Announcer (uncredited)
 Silver Skates (1943) - Promoter (uncredited)
 After Midnight with Boston Blackie (1943) - Justice of Peace Potts (uncredited)
 Henry Aldrich Gets Glamour (1943) - McCluskey (uncredited)
 Three Hearts for Julia (1943) - Smith (uncredited)
 False Faces (1943) - Desk Sergeant (uncredited)
 Nobody's Darling (1943) - Gas Station Attendant (uncredited)
 So's Your Uncle (1943) - Police Sergeant
 Wintertime (1943) - Husband (uncredited)
 Here Comes Kelly (1943) - Minor Role (uncredited)
 Thank Your Lucky Stars (1943) - Customer in Bette Davis Number (uncredited)
 My Kingdom for a Cook (1943) - Man in Pullman Car (uncredited)
 Swing Out the Blues (1943) - Malcolm P. Carstairs
 Whispering Footsteps (1943) - Chief Joe Charters (uncredited)
 The Girl in the Case (1944) - Smith (uncredited)
 Gambler's Choice (1944) - Barber (uncredited)
 Henry Aldrich Plays Cupid (1944) - Matthews (uncredited)
 The Adventures of Mark Twain (1944) - Spectator at Frog-Jumping Contest (uncredited)
 Show Business (1944) - Man with Binoculars (uncredited)
 Meet the People (1944) - Salesman on Train (uncredited)
 Silent Partner (1944) - Pop
 When Strangers Marry (1944) - Sam Prescott
 The Impatient Years (1944) - Bailiff (uncredited)
 Goin' to Town (1944) - Squire Skimp
 An American Romance (1944) - Fat Man (uncredited)
 The Town Went Wild (1944) - Mayor of Midvale (uncredited)
 Hi, Beautiful (1944) - Passenger
 Main Street After Dark (1945) - Mac McLean (uncredited)
 Adventures of Kitty O'Day (1945) - Bascom, Hotel Guest
 The Man Who Walked Alone (1945) - The Mayor
 The Clock (1945) - Man offering directions in Station (uncredited)
 Dillinger (1945) - Man in Bar (uncredited)
 Diamond Horseshoe (1945) - Footlight Club Waiter (uncredited)
 Where Do We Go from Here? (1945) - Father (uncredited)
 Wanderer of the Wasteland (1945) - Record Clerk and Jailer (uncredited)
 Gangs of the Waterfront (1945) - Police Chief Davis
 Christmas in Connecticut (1945) - Judge Crowthers
 Star in the Night (1945, Short) - Traveler (uncredited)
 Girls of the Big House (1945) - Felton
 Saratoga Trunk (1945) - Politician (uncredited)
 Adventure (1945) - George (uncredited)
 Abilene Town (1946) - Jailbreak Messenger (uncredited)
 My Reputation (1946) - Tipsy Man (uncredited)
 Deadline at Dawn (1946) - Chap (uncredited)
 Breakfast in Hollywood (1946) - Man in Bus Depot (uncredited)
 The Kid from Brooklyn (1946) - Man in Window (uncredited)
 Talk About a Lady (1946) - Baldwin (uncredited)
 Partners in Time (1946) - Squire Skimp
 Blondie's Lucky Day (1946) - Mr. Hankins (uncredited)
 Rainbow Over Texas (1946) - Yacht Captain Monroe
 That Texas Jamboree (1946) - Mayor Smith (uncredited)
 She Wrote the Book (1946) - Fat Man (uncredited)
 Hot Cargo (1946) - Frankie
 Cowboy Blues (1946) - Feather-Buyer (uncredited)
 The Dark Horse (1946) - Ben Martin (uncredited)
 Till the End of Time (1946) - Bartender (uncredited)
 High School Hero (1946) - Mayor Whitehead
 Decoy (1946) - Driver (uncredited)
 Dangerous Money (1946) - P.T. Burke
 Lady Luck (1946) - Fat Man (scenes deleted)
Ginger (1946) - Mayor Hector Tillford
 It's a Wonderful Life (1946) - Man on Porch (uncredited)
 The Devil Thumbs a Ride (1947) - Mack (uncredited)
 A Likely Story (1947) - Conductor (uncredited)
 For the Love of Rusty (1947) - Bill Worden (uncredited)
 That's My Gal (1947) - Stagedoor Man (uncredited)
 Copacabana (1947) - Mr. Green (uncredited)
 Desperate (1947) - Sheriff Hat Lewis (uncredited)
 Thunder Mountain (1947) - Dick (uncredited)
 The Son of Rusty (1947) - Mayor (uncredited)
 Singapore (1947) - Passenger (uncredited)
 Driftwood (1947) - Editor (uncredited)
 Magic Town (1947) - New Arrival (uncredited)
 The Fabulous Texan (1947) - Zebrina (uncredited)
 Heading for Heaven (1947) - Roger Wingate
 Doctor Jim (1947) - Edgar (uncredited)
 The Main Street Kid (1948) - Sam Trotter
 Slippy McGee (1948) - Fred Appelby
 Albuquerque (1948) - Harvey (uncredited)
 Money Madness (1948) - Malt Shop Customer (uncredited)
 The Sainted Sisters (1948) - Milt Freeman (uncredited)
 Silver River (1948) - Man Waiting Hours at McComb's (uncredited)
 The Dude Goes West (1948) - Whiskey Drummer (uncredited)
 So This Is New York (1948) - Audience Heckler (uncredited)
 The Vicious Circle (1948) - Businessman (uncredited)
 The Arkansas Swing (1948) - Realtor
 Good Sam (1948) - Politician (scenes deleted)
 Singin' Spurs (1948) - Mr. Miggs
 The Untamed Breed (1948) - Judge (uncredited)
 Rusty Leads the Way (1948) - Board Member (uncredited)
 The Return of October (1948) - Steward (uncredited)
 Homicide for Three (1948) - Doorman
 The Paleface (1948) - Mayor (uncredited)
 Rose of the Yukon (1949) - Doc Read
 Act of Violence (1949) - Convention Party Drunk (uncredited)
 I Cheated the Law (1949) - Bartender (uncredited)
 Joe Palooka in the Big Fight (1949) - Sid (uncredited)
 Flamingo Road (1949) - Tom Coyne (uncredited)
 The Gay Amigo (1949) - Man on Stage (uncredited)
 Night Unto Night (1949) - Auto Court Manager
 Trail of the Yukon (1949) - Editor Sullivan
 Feudin' Rhythm (1949) - Charles Chester Upperworth (uncredited)
 Gun Crazy (1950) - Man Fleeing Robbed Market (uncredited)
 Blue Grass of Kentucky (1950) - Grainger (uncredited)
 Blonde Dynamite (1950) - Mr. Stanton (uncredited)
 The Silver Bandit (1950) - Van Fleet Stooglehammer
 Belle of Old Mexico (1950) - Ship's Captain (uncredited)
 Western Pacific Agent (1950) - Sheriff
 Rock Island Trail (1950) - Martin, Railroad Conductor
 Lucky Losers (1950) - Clarence (uncredited)
 A Modern Marriage (1950) - Jim Burke
 September Affair (1950) - Fat Gentleman (uncredited)
 Union Station (1950) - Powerhouse Workman (uncredited)
 Bunco Squad (1950) - Thurman (uncredited)
 Across the Badlands (1950) - Rufus Downey
 Surrender (1950) - Sen. Clowe (uncredited)
 Joe Palooka in the Squared Circle (1950) - Sheriff
 Hunt the Man Down (1950) - Happy (uncredited)
 Belle Le Grand (1951) - Joe (uncredited)
 Flame of Stamboul (1951) - Mr. Shirley (uncredited)
 Two Dollar Bettor (1951) - Hefty Racetrack Drunk Bettor (uncredited)
 Disc Jockey (1951) - Customer (uncredited)
 Fort Defiance (1951) - Kincaid
 Honeychile (1951) - Sheriff
 Rancho Notorious (1952) - Storyteller (uncredited)
 Gobs and Gals (1952) - Shaving Man (uncredited)
 High Noon (1952) - Kibbee (uncredited)
 The Atomic City (1952) - Prize-Drawing MC (uncredited)
 Three for Bedroom "C" (1952) - Train Passenger (uncredited)
 Park Row (1952) - Jeff Hudson
 The WAC from Walla Walla (1952) - Sheriff (uncredited)
 Montana Belle (1952) - Jeptha Rideout - Banker
 Androcles and the Lion (1952) - Ox Cart Driver (uncredited)
 Witness to Murder (1954) - Apartment Manager
 Double Jeopardy (1955) - Happy Harry
 The Twinkle in God's Eye (1955) - Lumberman (uncredited)
 Last of the Desperados (1955) - Walter 'Wally' Stone
 Meet Me in Las Vegas (1956) - Sands Co-Owner (uncredited)
 When Gangland Strikes (1956) - Ames Jury Foreman (uncredited)
 Don't Knock the Rock (1956) - Sheriff at End
 Duel at Apache Wells (1957) - Jewelry Salesman (uncredited)
 Hold That Hypnotist (1957) - Hotel Desk Clerk
 Omar Khayyam (1957) - Tavern Owner (uncredited)
 The Joker Is Wild (1957) - Man Shaving (uncredited)
 Looking for Danger (1957) - Mike Clancy
 Bombers B-52 (1957) - Mr. Sampton (uncredited)
 Up in Smoke (1957) - Mike
 Man from God's Country (1958) - Mayor (uncredited)
 In the Money (1958) - Mike Clancy (uncredited)
 Desire Under the Elms (1958) - Old Farmer (uncredited)
 Life Begins at 17 (1958) - Lynton Baldwin (uncredited)
 Man of the West (1958) - Willie (uncredited)
 The Restless Gun (1958) - Episode "The Gold Star"
 Tales of Wells Fargo (1959, Episode "Lola Montez") - Mr. Collins
 Go, Johnny, Go! (1959) - Man in Phone Booth (uncredited)
 The Andy Griffith Show (1960-1961) - Mayor Pike (11 episodes)
 Bachelor Father (1961, Episode 125: "House At Smuggler's Cove") - Herbert Trindle

References

External links

 

1886 births
1961 deaths
20th-century American male actors
American male film actors
American male television actors
Male actors from Boston
Burials at Forest Lawn Memorial Park (Glendale)